The men's 200 metres event at the 2015 African Games was held on 16 and 17 September.

Medalists

Results

Heats
Qualification: First 3 in each heat (Q) and the next 3 fastest (q) advanced to the semifinals.

Wind:Heat 1: -0.1 m/s, Heat 2: -0.6 m/s, Heat 3: +0.2 m/s, Heat 4: +0.8 m/s, Heat 5: -0.3 m/s, Heat 6: +0.8 m/s, Heat 7: +0.4 m/s

Semifinals
Qualification: First 2 in each semifinal (Q) and the next 2 fastest (q) advanced to the final.

Wind:Heat 1: 0.0 m/s, Heat 2: 0.0 m/s, Heat 3: +0.1 m/s

Final
Wind: -1.2 m/s

References

200